The Elks Building in Globe, Arizona is a Romanesque style building built in 1910.  It has served as a meeting hall of the Benevolent and Protective Order of Elks (Elks) and as a theater.  It was listed on the National Register of Historic Places in 1987.

It is a 3-story  by  building that was socially important in Globe.

See also

Elks' Lodge No. 468: Kingman, Arizona
List of historic properties in Globe, Arizona

References

Clubhouses on the National Register of Historic Places in Arizona
Buildings and structures in Globe, Arizona
Elks buildings
1910 establishments in Arizona Territory
National Register of Historic Places in Gila County, Arizona
Individually listed contributing properties to historic districts on the National Register in Arizona
Romanesque Revival architecture in the United States
Buildings and structures completed in 1910